Viasat may refer to:
Viasat (American company) (founded 1986)
Viasat (Nordic television service) (founded 1991)
 Danish 1st Division, officially Viasat Divisionen, second-highest football league in Denmark
 Viasat Cup, 2006 Danish football tournament
Viasat Ukraine, a Ukrainian direct broadcast satellite television distributor
Viasat World, operator of: 
Viasat Nature
Viasat Explore
Viasat History
Viasat 1, a Ghanaian television channel 
Viasat 3, a Hungarian TV channel
Viasat 6, a thematic television channel of Sony Pictures Television Networks
Viasat Ticket, a defunct Scandinavian pay-per-view service

See also
ViaSat-1, ViaSat-2, and ViaSat-3, satellites launched by the American company